Mian Rud (also Romanized as Mīān Rūd) is a village in Esfivard-e Shurab Rural District, in the Central District of Sari County, Mazandaran Province, Iran. At the 2006 census, its population was 675, in 181 families.

Notes 

Populated places in Sari County